Bussetti was a London-based band who were active between 2001 and 2007. Their style was a mish-mash of genres, including hip hop, funk, jazz, indie and pop.

During their career, as well as playing at venues all over the UK, they performed at several music festivals, including the 2003 and 2006 Big Chill festivals, and the 2004 Dour Festival in Belgium.

They released two 12" singles, Softly (2003) and The Itch/Debussetti (2004)  and an album - Where Have You Been (2007).

Their work has been remixed by artists such as Four Tet and Xploding Plastix.

They split up in June 2007.

History

Bussetti were formed in 2001 in London by a group of musicians who had all met at university. They named themselves after the former landlord of two of the band, who was subsequently murdered in 2002. Their early influences were Lamb, Red Snapper and The Cinematic Orchestra.

They had a varied line-up (see below), and performed regularly in London and around the UK.

Discography

Softly

The band's début 12" single, Softly, featured a remix by Four Tet, plus instrumental and a capella versions. Produced by band members Dan Edge and Henry Scowcroft, it was recorded at the Premises studios in Hackney, London, in 2003, and released on the band's own (now-defunct) label, Realise Records.

 A1: Softly
 A2: Softly (instrumental)
 B1: Softly (Four Tet remix)
 B2: Softly (a capella)

The Itch/Debussetti
Their second single was a 'double-A' side, featuring tracks The Itch and Debussetti. It was also released on Realise Records.

 A1 The Itch
 A2 The Itch (radio edit)
 B1 Debussetti
 B2 Debussetti (radio edit)

The Story So Far

Prior to the release of Where Have You Been (see below), the band pulled together all their material to date and released it as a free CD, given out at gigs. The track listing was:

 Spanish Jake
 Nings
 The Itch
 Debussetti
 Diskaplin (live)
 Debussetti (Xploding Plastix remix)
 The Itch (King Seven remix)
 Debussetti (Deckshufflers remix)
 Softly (Four Tet remix)
 Jon Kennedy – Useless Wooden Toys (Bussetti remix)
 Verbrilli Sound – Honey Czars (Bussetti remix)

Where Have You Been

In 2007, the band released a full-length CD album, Where Have You Been. Produced by the band, and mixed and mastered by Ben Spektor, it was recorded at various locations including The Premises in London, and featured guest appearances by double bassists Tim Pharaoh and Omri Chetrit, and session percussionist Preston Heyman.

The track listing was:

 Singasong
 Spanish Jake
 Softly
 The Itch
 The Scratch
 Words
 Nings
 Song with 3 Names
 Not From Round Here
 Debussetti

The album was released at Bussetti's farewell gig, at the Luminaire in London, on 9 June 2007. It can currently be streamed from SoundCloud.

Other material

Bussetti contributed mixes to Ninja Tune's Solid Steel radio show, and did remixes for Canadian Downtempo artist Verbrilli Sound  and UK musician Jon Kennedy.

They placed a collection of remixes done for the band, together with unreleased live and instrumental tracks, on SoundCloud.

In December 2011, their single Debussetti was featured by Tom Robinson on BBC6 Music's Introducing show.

Line-up

The live band revolved around a core of five, supplemented by various others. The initial line-up was:

 Jana Hermon - vocals
 Charlie Miller - vocals, guitar, saxophone
 Jez Humble - synthesizer
 Daniel Edge - keyboards
 Oli Bird - drums
 Henry Scowcroft - bass
 Susannah Price - cello

Prior to the departure of Humble and Price, the band was joined by saxophonist Nick Atkins and scratch DJ Nick Flugge. In 2005, drummer Oli Bird moved to LA and was replaced by Dor Kelman. In later years, trombophonist Jamie Fagg, harp/clarinetist Kat Arney, synth player Rui Teimao, and VJ Mark van der Vord played with the band. For their final live appearance at London's Luminare in June 2007, their line-up was:

 Jana Hermon - vocals
 Charlie Miller - vocals, guitar, alto saxophone
 Daniel Edge - keyboards/harmonium
 Rui Teimao - synthesizer
 Dor Kelman - Drums
 Jamie Fagg - trombone
 Nick Atkins - soprano/tenor saxophone
 Kat Arney - Harp/bass clarinet
 Henry Scowcroft - bass/guitar
 Mark van der Vord - visuals

Further reading
 Interview with The Big Chill - by Susanna Glaser, 2004
 Interview with Pop Up Music magazine - (Polish), 2004
 The Itch/Debussetti review, by Pop Up Music magazine, 2004 (Polish)
 Big Chill feature article - posted on bigchill.net, 2006

External links
 Bussetti on MySpace
 Bussetti on SoundCloud
 Bussetti on Last.Fm

References

Musical groups from London
Musical groups established in 2001
Musical groups disestablished in 2007
2001 establishments in England